Anna Rose O'Sullivan (born 16 April 1994) is an English ballet dancer and is a principal dancer at the Royal Ballet. Her promotion to principal dancer took effect in September 2021.

Early life
O'Sullivan was born in Harrow, London and raised in Ickenham. Her father is a construction contracts manager and her mother works in the NHS. She has two younger brothers and a younger sister. She started dance at age two, and performed with London Children's Ballet. She has also performed in musical theatre, and appeared as Cosette  in Les Misérables and in Chitty Chitty Bang Bang on the West End. She entered The Royal Ballet School at age 11.

Career
O'Sullivan graduated into The Royal Ballet in 2012. In 2015, she danced her first major role, Clara in The Nutcracker. Her performance was endorsed by Peter Wright, the production's choreographer. She was named First Artist in 2016, Soloist in 2017, First Soloist in 2019 and Principal in 2021. Her first principal role was Alice in Alice's Adventures in Wonderland, and she went on to portray other lead roles such as Juliet in Romeo and Juliet, Princess Aurora in The Sleeping Beauty and Swanida in Coppelia. In May 2021, the Royal Ballet announced that O'Sullivan's promotion to principal dancer will take effect in September 2021.

Selected repertoire
O'Sullivan's repertoire with The Royal Ballet includes:

References

Living people
1994 births
English ballerinas
People educated at the Royal Ballet School
Principal dancers of The Royal Ballet
People from Harrow, London
21st-century British ballet dancers